Palmetto is a village in St. Landry Parish, Louisiana, United States. The population was 188 at the 2000 census. It is part of the Opelousas–Eunice Micropolitan Statistical Area.

Geography
Palmetto is located at  (30.716729, -91.907648).

According to the United States Census Bureau, the village has a total area of 0.9 square miles (2.3 km), all land.

Demographics

As of the 2010 United States Census, there were 164 people living in the village. The racial makeup of the village was 50.6% White, 45.1% Black and 4.3% from two or more races.

As of the census of 2000, there were 188 people, 75 households, and 48 families living in the village. The racial makeup of the village was 40.43% White, 58.51% African American, and 1.06% from two or more races. Hispanic or Latino of any race were 1.06% of the population. This does not account for the Creole/Cajun population; a distinct culture which is made up of several ethnic groups.

There were 75 households, out of which 32.0% had children under the age of 18 living with them, 38.7% were married couples living together, 21.3% had a female householder with no husband present, and 34.7% were non-families. 34.7% of all households were made up of individuals, and 14.7% had someone living alone who was 65 years of age or older. The average household size was 2.51 and the average family size was 3.24.

In the village, the population was spread out, with 31.9% under the age of 18, 9.0% from 18 to 24, 22.3% from 25 to 44, 18.6% from 45 to 64, and 18.1% who were 65 years of age or older. The median age was 33 years. For every 100 females, there were 97.9 males. For every 100 females age 18 and over, there were 80.3 males.

The median income for a household in the village was $28,750, and the median income for a family was $38,125. Males had a median income of $32,917 versus $11,250 for females. The per capita income for the village was $7,787. About 31.7% of families and 36.2% of the population were below the poverty line, including 38.7% of those under the age of eighteen and 32.1% of those 65 or over.

In popular culture
Brit Bennett's second novel The Vanishing Half is based on her mother's memories of growing up in Palmetto. "She brought it up the way parents often do, like it’s something everybody knew...that there were towns where people would intermarry so that their children would get lighter with each generation."

Notable people
Morris Pejoe, (1924–1982), a Chicago blues singer, guitarist, and songwriter was born in Palmetto

References

Villages in Louisiana
Villages in St. Landry Parish, Louisiana